Retinoic acid receptor alpha (RAR-α), also known as NR1B1 (nuclear receptor subfamily 1, group B, member 1) is a nuclear receptor that in humans is encoded by the RARA gene.

NR1B1 is a gene with a protein product and has a chromosomal location of 17q21.2. RARA codes for the nuclear hormone receptor Retinoic Acid Receptor, Alpha subtype, and are themselves transcription factors. There are another 2 subtypes of RARs, Beta subtype, and Gamma subtype.

Function 

Retinoid signaling is transduced by 2 families of nuclear receptors, retinoic acid receptor (RAR) and retinoid X receptor (RXR), which form RXR/RAR heterodimers. In the absence of ligand, DNA-bound RXR/RARA represses transcription by recruiting the corepressors NCOR1, SMRT (NCOR2), and histone deacetylase. When ligand binds to the complex, it induces a conformational change allowing the recruitment of coactivators, histone acetyltransferases, and the basic transcription machinery.

Retinoic Acid Receptor Alpha, the protein, interacts with retinoic acid, a derivative of Vitamin A, which plays an important role in cell growth, differentiation, and the formation of organs in embryonic development.

Once Retinoic Acid binds to the RAR, they initiate transcription and allow for their respective gene to be expressed.

Clinical significance 

RA signaling has been correlated with several signaling pathways in early embryonic development. First, it participates in the formation of the embryonic axis, which establishes symmetry in the offspring. RA also influences neural differentiation by regulating the expression of pro-neural induction factor Neurogenin 2 (Neurog2). RA affects cardiogenesis, as it plays a role specifically in the formation of the atrial chambers of the heart. RA also plays a role in the development of the pancreas, kidneys, lungs, and extremities.  

Translocations that always involve rearrangement of the RARA gene are a cardinal feature of acute promyelocytic leukemia (APL; MIM 612376). The most frequent translocation is t(15,17)(q21;q22), which fuses the RARA gene with the PML gene.

Interactions 

Retinoic acid receptor alpha has been shown to interact with:

 BAG1, 
 CLOCK,
 CCND3,
 NCOA6, 
 NCOR1,
 NCOR2,
 NPAS2,
 NRIP1,
 NR0B2,
 NR4A2,
 PML 
 RXRA.
 Src,
 TADA3L, and
 ZBTB16.

Genetic Studies 
Knock-out mice studies showed that a deletion in one of the copies of the RARA gene did not create any observable defect, while deletion of both copies shows symptoms similar to that of Vitamin A deficiency. This proved that all 3 subtypes of RARs work redundantly.

Ligands
Antagonists
 BMS-189453 (non selective)
 YCT529 (selective for RAR-α)

See also 
 Retinoic acid receptor
Retinoic X Receptor
 Acute promyelocytic leukemia

References

Further reading 

 
 
 
 
 
 
 
 
 
 
 
 
 
 
 
 
 

Intracellular receptors
Transcription factors